Hollis Burnley Chenery (January 6, 1918 – September 1, 1994) was an American economist well known for his pioneering contribution in the field of development economics.

Early life
Chenery was born in Richmond, son of Christopher Chenery, a businessman and horseman. He was educated in Virginia, Pelham Manor, New York and at the University of Arizona (BSc Mathematics, 1939), the University of Oklahoma (BSc Engineering, 1941), and California Institute of Technology (MSc Engineering, 1943). He served in the United States Army Air Forces in World War II. After the war he earned degrees from the University of Virginia (MA Economics, 1947) and Harvard University (PhD Economics, 1950). His doctoral dissertation, entitled Engineering Bases of Economic Analysis, was written under the direction of Wassily Leontief.

Career
He worked as a professor of economics at Stanford from 1952 to 1961, as a Guggenheim fellow in 1961 and joined the United States Agency for International Development in 1961, and rose to become an assistant administrator.

In 1965 Chenery became a professor of economics at Harvard. His 1966 article with Alan Strout, "Foreign assistance and economic development", provided a macro-economic theory of development aid's effectiveness which remained, for the following 20 years or more, the most explicit model available.

Chenery worked as the World Bank's vice president for development policy from 1972 through to 1982. Serving under the presidency of Robert McNamara during most of his time at the Bank, Chenery oversaw an increase in the Bank's research capacity. Although his earlier work had played a part in fixing the focus of aid on targets for overall economic growth, Chenery in the 1970s investigated ways in which this growth could take place in such a way as to benefit the poor. This research – which was published notably in the 1974  book Redistribution with growth – helped the Bank move to a more poverty-focused approach in the mid- and late 1970s.

Chenery's work was wide-ranging but might be summarised as involving the analysis of patterns of development, the use of a two-gap model and multi-sectoral analysis.

Horse racing fame
After his father died in January 1973, his sister Penny Chenery raced Secretariat on behalf of the family. Secretariat became the first horse in 25 years to win the American Triple Crown, with record-setting victories in the Kentucky Derby, the Preakness and the Belmont Stakes. After Secretariat's victory in the Belmont Stakes, Hollis Chenery led the horse down the walkway to the winner's circle as cameras took pictures and the crowd gave a standing ovation. He was played by Dylan Baker in the 2010 film Secretariat.

Selected works
His major works include:
Chenery, Hollis. (1952). Overcapacity and the acceleration principle., Econometrica
  .
Chenery, Hollis; Clark, P. (1959). Interindustry economics.
Chenery, Hollis. (1960). Patterns of industrial growth., American Economic Review
Chenery, Hollis. (1961). Comparative advantage and development policy., American Economic Review
Chenery, Hollis; Strout, A. (1966). Foreign assistance and economic development., American Economic Review
Chenery, Hollis; et al. (1971). Studies in development planning.
Chenery, Hollis; et al. (1974). Redistibution with growth: an approach to policy.
Chenery, Hollis; Syrquin, R. (1975). Patterns of development, 1950–1970.
Chenery, Hollis. (1975). A structuralist approach to development policy, 1975., American Economic Review
Chenery, Hollis. (1979). Structural change and development policy.
Chenery, Hollis. (1983). Interaction between theory and observation, world development.

References

External links
 
 

1918 births
1994 deaths
20th-century American economists
American officials of the United Nations
California Institute of Technology alumni
American development economists
Economists from Arizona
Economists from New York (state)
Fellows of the Econometric Society
Harvard Graduate School of Arts and Sciences alumni
Harvard University faculty
People from Pelham Manor, New York
Stanford University Department of Economics faculty
United States Army Air Forces soldiers
United States Army personnel of World War II
University of Arizona alumni
University of Oklahoma alumni
University of Virginia alumni
World Bank Chief Economists